Breed to Breathe is an EP by English extreme metal band Napalm Death, released in 1997 through Earache on CD.

Release
The album is printed as CD Extra and contains a data track which features the video clip for the song "Breed to Breathe" and other band-related content such as a discography and a band history. Due to the depiction of graphic material the video clip prompted the Freiwillige Selbstkontrolle der Filmwirtschaft, the German motion picture rating system organization, to ban it in Germany and even to obtain a court decision that declared the clip illegal. Many media around the world also refused to feature the clip.

Both bands that deliver a Napalm Death song on the sixth track are winners of a demo cover version competition that Napalm Death had launched in summer 1997 and limited to bands without a recording contract.

Track listing

Personnel

Napalm Death
 Mark "Barney" Greenway – vocals
 Jesse Pintado – lead guitar
 Mitch Harris – rhythm guitar
 Shane Embury – bass
 Danny Herrera – drums

Technical personnel
 Colin Richardson – production
 Paul Siddens – recording
 Andy Sneap – mixing
 Tony Wooliscroft – band photograph
 Antz White – design, layout
 Graham Humphreys – design, layout
 Scalp – multimedia construction

References

1997 EPs
Napalm Death EPs
Earache Records EPs